Gareth Howell "Gary" Jones (born June 12, 1945) is a former left-handed Major League Baseball relief pitcher who played in 1970 and 1971 for the New York Yankees.

Prior to playing professional baseball, Jones attended Whittier College. He was signed as an amateur free agent by the Yankees before the 1967 season, and on September 25, 1970 he made his big league debut with them. In his first major league appearance, he faced the Detroit Tigers, pitching two scoreless innings with two hits allowed, one walk, and two strikeouts (Gene Lamont and Norm Cash). He appeared in a total of two games that season, allowing three hits in two innings of work. His ERA was 0.00.

He appeared in 12 games in 1971, allowing 14 earned runs in 14 innings for a 9.00 ERA. He made his final big league appearance on July 6. Both he and Terry Ley were traded twice on the same day at the Winter Meetings on December 2, 1971. They were first sent from the Yankees to the Texas Rangers for Bernie Allen, then along with Del Unser and Denny Riddleberger to the Cleveland Indians for Roy Foster, Rich Hand, Mike Paul and Ken Suarez.

References

External links

1945 births
Living people
Major League Baseball pitchers
New York Yankees players
Portland Beavers players
Syracuse Chiefs players
Whittier Poets baseball players
Sportspeople from Los Angeles County, California
Baseball players from California